Ferula (from Latin ferula, 'rod') is a genus of about 220 species of flowering plants in the family Apiaceae, native to the Mediterranean region east to central Asia, mostly growing in arid climates. They are herbaceous perennial plants growing to 1–4 m tall, with stout, hollow, somewhat succulent stems. The leaves are tripinnate or even more finely divided, with a stout basal sheath clasping the stem. The flowers are usually yellow, rarely white, produced in large umbels. Many plants of this genus, especially F. communis, are referred to as "giant fennel," although they are not fennel in the strict sense.

Selected species

The Roman spice laser or laserpicium probably came from a species of Ferula, either an extinct one or Ferula tingitana, though other identities have been suggested.

Uses

The gummy resin of many species of Ferula is used for various purposes:
Ferula foetida, Ferula assa-foetida and some other species are used to make the spice asafoetida, or hing
Ferula gummosa makes galbanum
Ferula hermonis makes zallouh
Ferula moschata makes sumbul
Ferula persica or F. szowitziana makes sagapenum
Ferula marmarica makes "Cyrenaican ammoniacum"
Ferula ammoniacum makes "Persian ammoniacum"
Ferula communis subsp. brevifolia makes "Moroccan ammoniacum"
Silphium was used to make laserpicium

The Romans called the hollow light rod made from this plant a ferula (compare also fasces, judicial birches). Such rods were used for walking sticks, splints, for stirring boiling liquids, and for corporal punishment.

References

External links

 
Apioideae genera
Medicinal plants